Ayyalonia dimentmani is a species of pseudoscorpion in the Chthoniidae family that is endemic to Israel.

References

Endemic fauna of Israel
Chthoniidae
Animals described in 2008
Arthropods of Israel